Parliamentary elections were held in Cuba on 3 February 2013.

Electoral system
The 612 members of the National Assembly of People's Power were elected in single-member constituencies. Candidates had to obtain at least 50% of the valid votes in a constituency to be elected. If no candidate passed the 50% threshold, the seat was left vacant unless the Council of State chose to hold a by-election.

Only one candidate stood in each constituency, having been approved by the National Candidature Commission. The electoral law in force at the time stated that half of the candidates had to be municipal councillors, whilst the remaining half were put forward by assemblies composed of members of the Committees for the Defense of the Revolution and groups representing farmers, students, women, workers and young people.

Results

References

2013 elections in the Caribbean
2013 in Cuba
2013
One-party elections
Single-candidate elections
February 2013 events in North America